Andreas Vanpoucke (born August 5, 1959) is a Belgian painter and etcher.

Born in Diksmuide, Belgium, he was educated from 1975 to 1982 at the fine art school in Ghent, Belgium. http://www.luca-arts.be/campus/sint-lucas-gent
During his studies, his personal research on engravings, drawings and oil paintings were on Rembrandt, Degas and Ensor as well as figurative painting of the nineteenth and twentieth centuries.

He was offered a professorship at the Graduate School St. Lucas, Karel de Grote Hogeschool in Antwerp, Belgium, where he entered in 1983. 
He is Professor of Fine Arts in drawing and painting. 
Between 1975 and 1999, he produced numerous art calendars at the request of the cultural organizations in cities such as Blankenberge, Koksijde, Handzame, Bruges, Saint Remy de Provence, etc.
He has been painting since his childhood, mainly oil, but he also produced numerous drawings, watercolors and etchings.   
Back from his travels in Portugal, he discovered France and Provence and decided to settle in 1997 in Saint Rémy de Provence.  
His first solo exhibition there, entitled "Saint Rémy daily", held in 1999 at the Zero Hang'Art gallery of the Surreal painter François Otte.
Since then, the mayor of Saint Remy de Provence continually exposes the main triptych and mainly private collectors own his oeuvres.  
He created a series of large oil paintings around " Les Calanques " and "Les Baux de Provence"

From 2006 he focused his work on the city of Antwerp and its inhabitants. In 2007 he exhibited "The Mosaic of Antwerp", with over two hundred 30×40 cm acrylics and has a multi-faceted face of metropolis.
In May 2010 he was invited by the village of Barbizon to participate at the international exposition " l'Angelus de Millet 150 years "  
In 2010 and 2011 he showed his "wall of tenderness" on Leila Voight's first and second international festival of contemporary art APart
in Saint-Rémy de Provence.

During the winter of 2012 he started his etching cyclus ' Le Midi en Noir et Blanc ' 
In April 2013 he showed his Antwerpmosaïc in the ancient 'De Beuckelaer' atelier http://www.fairview.be/pages/projecten/kievit/ in Antwerp -Kievit 
In 2014 he was invited as guest in the Jacques Gorus atelier http://www.jacquesgorus.be - with the exhibition ' Une poignée de pointes sèches' with the catalogue
designed by Dooreman :nl:Gert Dooreman 
In 2015 he showed his 'wall of tenderness' at the request of the Cultural circle of Kortemark in the exhibition ' Van Handzame tot de Provence '

Paintings

Prints

References

External links
Official website 

1959 births
Living people
Belgian etchers
Belgian painters
People from Diksmuide